Dermot mac Tadhg Mor, 7th king of Moylurg, reigned from 1124 to 1159. Vassal and kinsman of the O Conchobhair Kings of Connacht. Dermot was the progenitor of the MacDermot family, as well as its offshoot septs such as MacDermot Roe, McDonagh, and Crowley (surname).

References
 "Mac Dermot of Moylurg: The Story of a Connacht Family", Dermot Mac Dermot, 1996.
 http://www.macdermot.com/

Connachta
1159 deaths
12th-century Irish monarchs
People from County Roscommon
MacDermot family